The 2022 SAFF U-17 Championship was the 7th edition of the SAFF U-17 Championship, an international football competition for men's under-17 national teams organized by South Asian Football Federation (SAFF). The tournament was took place in Sri Lanka from September 5 to 14, 2022. Six teams from the region  took part.

India is the defending champion. They have won previous season title by beating Nepal 7−0 on 31 August 2019.

Participating teams
FIFA suspended Pakistan Football Federation on 7 April 2021, but eventually withdrew the ban, yet they could not participate in the competition as it was too late for them to be ready.

Venue
All matches are being held at the Racecourse Ground in Colombo, Sri Lanka.

Officials

Referees
 Abdulla Shathir
 Athambawa Mohammed Jafran
 Pema Tshewang
 Kabin Byanjankar

Assistant Referees
 Sujoy Barua
 Md Alamgir Sarker
 Liyanagunawardhana D. Sampath
 Niushad Mohamed
 Yunal Malla
 Passang Tshering

Draw
Once the hosting nation is announced, it will be put in the 1st position of pot 1 while Maldives will be moved to pot 3.

Players' eligibility
Players born on or after 1 January 2006, are eligible to compete in the tournament. Each team has to register a squad of minimum 16 players and maximum 23 players, minimum two of whom must be goalkeepers.

Group stage
Times listed are UTC+05:30 Sri Lanka Standard Time.

Tiebreakers
Teams are ranked according to points (3 points for a win, 1 point for a draw, 0 points for a loss), and if tied on points, the following tiebreaking criteria are applied, in the order given, to determine the rankings.
Points in head-to-head matches among tied teams;
Goal difference in head-to-head matches among tied teams;
Goals scored in head-to-head matches among tied teams;
If more than two teams are tied, and after applying all head-to-head criteria above, a subset of teams are still tied, all head-to-head criteria above are reapplied exclusively to this subset of teams;
Goal difference in all group matches;
Goals scored in all group matches;
Penalty shoot-out if only two teams are tied and they met in the last round of the group;
Disciplinary points (yellow card = 1 point, red card as a result of two yellow cards = 3 points, direct red card = 3 points, yellow card followed by direct red card = 4 points);
Drawing of lots.

Group A

Group B

Knockout stage

Bracket

Semi-finals

Final

Winner

Goalscorers

See also
 2022 SAFF U-20 Championship
 2022 SAFF Women's Championship
 2022 SAFF U-18 Women's Championship

References 

SAFF U-15 Championship
SAFF
SAFF